Hasanabad-e Gilavand (also Romanized as Ḩasanābād-e Gīlāvand; also known as Ḩasanābād) is a village in Azna Rural District, in the Central District of Khorramabad County, Lorestan Province, Iran. At the 2006 census, its population was 39, in 8 families.

References 

Towns and villages in Khorramabad County